McLoone is a surname. Notable people with the surname include:

Leo McLoone (born 1989), Gaelic footballer
Paul McLoone (born 1967), Irish musician
Peter McLoone (born 1950), Irish trade union leader